Sheri Meyers, Psy.D is a marriage and family therapist, television talk show host and commentator, and most recently author. Meyers is based in Los Angeles, California. She is most commonly quoted and interviewed in matters of relationship and infidelity issues. Dr. Sheri has appeared on various networks including CNN, ABC, NBC,CBS
 and Fox,
 as well as television talk shows. In addition, Dr. Sheri is known for her radio talk show appearances and nationally published articles.

Dr. Sheri Meyers released her first book, entitled ‘Chatting or Cheating: How to Detect Infidelity, Rebuild Love and Affair Proof Your Relationship.’

Career
Meyers spent the early years of her career as a marriage and family therapist. She has seen thousands of individuals, couples, and families over a 25-year period. Beginning in 1999, Meyers expanded her career and began to host and produce the television talk show "Straight from the Heart." This program aired for 11 seasons. The interviewed-based talk show was dedicated to helping viewers enrich their lives and improve their relationships.

Starting in 2012, Meyers began writing for the Huffington Post. Meyers is cited to speak on relationships, especially matters of intimacy and infidelity. Her primary focus in writing has been helping individuals recognize, overcome and heal a variety of relationship and intimacy related issues. Dr. Sheri has knowledge ranging from "emotional sex" and infidelity, to strengthening weakened or vulnerable relationships, to breaking up and making up.

Meyers also writes for online magazines including Yahoo! Shine and SheKnows.com. In March 2013, Meyers wrote a featured article and created a test for the Katie Couric Show, In the article she discussed the risks of social networking and internet acting like other addictions. This was incorporated with other points to display how social media and technology in general has changed relationships.

Dr. Sheri's relationship guidance and advice has also appeared in various printed and online magazines, including USA Today, Men's Health, Women's Health, Divorce Magazine, Prevention Magazine, and Cosmopolitan Magazine.

Meyers was recently rated by About.com as the number 1 Sex and Dating Expert to like on Facebook.

Chatting or Cheating Book

Meyers' first book "Chatting or Cheating: How to Detect Infidelity, Rebuild Love and Affair-Proof Your Relationship" was released on March 5, 2012. The book is published by From the Heart Media. In her book Dr. Sheri Meyers provides readers with guidance on issues such as: preventing or detecting infidelity, confronting a cheating partner, surviving betrayal, rebuilding trust, and repairing intimacy and safely loving again.

Various television shows and networks have featured Meyers discussing "Chatting or Cheating" including The Ricki Lake Show, The Steve Harvey Show, CBS "The Couch", KTLA and Fox Studio 11.

In the book Meyers discusses a term she names "emotional sex." Meyers defines emotional sex as "a sexual chemistry; that you may or may not recognize; a secret attraction and feeling of intimacy that you have with another person." This term is referring to emotional infidelity that may or may not lead to physical infidelity.

References

21st-century American psychologists
Living people
Year of birth missing (living people)